Military Comics, later Modern Comics, was a comic book anthology title published by Quality Comics during the Golden Age of Comic Books from 1941 until 1950. The first issue of Military Comics is notable for featuring the debut of Blackhawk, Blue Tracer, and Miss America.

With issue #44 (Nov. 1945), the title of the series was changed to Modern Comics. The series ended with issue #102 (Oct. 1950).

Creators involved with the title include Reed Crandall, Chuck Cuidera, Everett M. "Busy" Arnold, Klaus Nordling, Bob Powell, Fred Guardineer, Elmer Wexler, and Al McWilliams.

References

External links
 
 

Comics magazines published in the United States
Quality Comics titles
1941 comics debuts
1950 comics endings
Magazines established in 1941
Magazines disestablished in 1950
Golden Age comics titles
Military comics